George Gipps  (1791–1847) was the Governor of New South Wales.

George Gipps may also refer to:

George Gipps (MP for Canterbury) (c. 1728–1800), English apothecary, hop merchant, banker and politician
George Gipps (MP for Ripon) (1783–1869), Member of Parliament (MP) for Ripon, son of above

See also

 George Gipp, "The Gipper" (1895–1920), American football player for Notre Dame
 Gipps (surname)
 Gipps (disambiguation)